The white-winged shrike-tanager (Lanio versicolor) is a species of bird in the family Thraupidae. It is found in Bolivia, Brazil, and Peru in subtropical or tropical moist lowland forests. Two subspecies are recognised, L. v. versicolor from eastern Peru, western Brazil and northern Bolivia, and L. v. parvus from eastern and central Brazil and northeastern Bolivia.

Description

The male has a black head with a patch of yellowish olive at the front of the crown. The back and rump are yellowish ochre, and the underparts are yellow apart from an olive bib at the throat. The wings and tail are blackish, and there is a large patch of white on the outer wing-coverts. The female is much more uniform in colour, being brownish ochre above, the wings and tail being darker than the other upper parts, and yellowish ochre below, with an especially yellow belly. The male is quite distinctive, but the female could be confused with the flame-crested tanager (Tachyphonus cristatus), but the latter has browner upper parts and is buffish ochre rather than yellowish ochre below. The beak is large and sharply hooked in both sexes, the upper mandible having a "tooth" at the tip.

Ecology
This bird feeds on insects and fruit. The cup-shaped nest is composed of plant fibres woven together. The species is fairly common and often occurs in pairs, or may form small groups with other species. It is vocal, with several loud calls, the most frequent being a descending "twéééu!", repeated several times. When in a group, it often seems to lead other species with its vocalisation. It forages in the mid to high canopy of humid forests and is seldom seen at the forest edge.

References

white-winged shrike-tanager
Birds of the Amazon Basin
white-winged shrike-tanager
Taxonomy articles created by Polbot